Dr. Virgil Cox House is a historic home located at Galax, Virginia.  It was built about 1913, and is a large -story frame dwelling with Queen Anne and Colonial Revival style design elements.  It has a complex exterior presentation, complex roof plan, and an equally complex floor
plan.  The house is sheathed in German siding and features irregular, front-gable projections on the facade and north side; a projection with a polygonal bay on the southwest corner, a gable-roof dormer on the facade; and a small, upper balcony on the facade with attenuated Tuscan columns and pilasters.  Also on the property are a contributing boxwood garden and outbuilding.

It was listed on the National Register of Historic Places in 2004.

References

Houses on the National Register of Historic Places in Virginia
Queen Anne architecture in Virginia
Colonial Revival architecture in Virginia
Houses completed in 1913
Houses in Galax, Virginia
National Register of Historic Places in Galax, Virginia
1913 establishments in Virginia